Melfort is a provincial electoral district for the Legislative Assembly of Saskatchewan, Canada. The city of Melfort (population 5,992) is the largest centre in the constituency.

Smaller communities in the district include the towns of Watson, Star City, Leroy, and Naicam; and the villages of Quill Lake, Spalding, Beatty, Englefeld, and Annaheim.

The riding has existed since the 1912 election.

History 
The riding initially returned primarily NDP members, starting with Arthur Thibault. Since then, it has returned MLAs from all three major parties. Most recently it has returned Saskatchewan Party MLAs, since 1997.

Members of the Legislative Assembly

Election results

Melfort (2003–present) 

 

 

|-

 
|NDP
|Ivan Yackel
|align="right"|1,599
|align="right"|24.68
|align="right"|-5.41

|-

 
|NDP
|Dale Renneberg
|align="right"|2,191
|align="right"|30.09
|align="right"|-8.16

|-

 
|NDP
|Garnet Davis
|align="right"|2,833
|align="right"|38.25

Melfort-Tisdale (1995–2003)

|-

 
|NDP
|Carol Carson
|align="right"|2,489
|align="right"|31.53
|align="right"|-6.70

^ Saskatchewan Party change is from Progressive Conservative

|-

 
|NDP
|Carol Carson
|align="right"|3,168
|align="right"|38.23

|Prog. Conservative
|Bill Ripley
|align="right"|1,237
|align="right"|14.93

Melfort (1975–1995)

|-
 
| style="width: 130px"|NDP
|Carol Carson
|align="right"|3,011
|align="right"|41.12
|align="right"|+3.55

|Prog. Conservative
|Ken Naber
|align="right"|2,516
|align="right"|34.36
|align="right"|-21.74

|- bgcolor="white"
!align="left" colspan=3|Total
!align="right"|7,322
!align="right"|100.00
!align="right"|

|-
 
| style="width: 130px"|Progressive Conservative
|Grant Hodgins
|align="right"|4,433
|align="right"|56.10
|align="right"|+0.66

|NDP
|Keith Davis
|align="right"|2,969
|align="right"|37.57
|align="right"|+0.43

|- bgcolor="white"
!align="left" colspan=3|Total
!align="right"|7,902
!align="right"|100.00
!align="right"|

|-
 
| style="width: 130px"|Progressive Conservative
|Grant Hodgins
|align="right"|4,626
|align="right"|55.44
|align="right"|+11.52

|NDP
|Norman Vickar
|align="right"|3,099
|align="right"|37.14
|align="right"|-11.85

|- bgcolor="white"
!align="left" colspan=3|Total
!align="right"|8,344
!align="right"|100.00
!align="right"|

|-
 
| style="width: 130px"|NDP
|Norman Vickar
|align="right"|4,181
|align="right"|48.99
|align="right"|+11.61

|Progressive Conservative
|Bill Warner
|align="right"|3,749
|align="right"|43.92
|align="right"|+7.76

|- bgcolor="white"
!align="left" colspan=3|Total
!align="right"|8,535
!align="right"|100.00
!align="right"|

|-
 
| style="width: 130px"|NDP
|Norman Vickar
|align="right"|3,102
|align="right"|37.38
|align="right"|-22.02

|Progressive Conservative
|Bill Warner
|align="right"|3,001
|align="right"|36.16
|align="right"|–

|- bgcolor="white"
!align="left" colspan=3|Total
!align="right"|8,299
!align="right"|100.00
!align="right"|

Melfort-Kinistino (1971–1975)

|-
 
| style="width: 130px"|NDP
|Arthur Thibault
|align="right"|6,103
|align="right"|59.40
|align="right"|–

|- bgcolor="white"
!align="left" colspan=3|Total
!align="right"|10,274
!align="right"|100.00
!align="right"|

Melfort-Tisdale (1952–1971)

|-
 
|style="width: 130px"|NDP
|Clarence G. Willis
|align="right"|4,133
|align="right"|50.94%
|align="right"|+10.68

|- bgcolor="white"
!align="left" colspan=3|Total
!align="right"|8,114
!align="right"|100.00%
!align="right"|

|-
 
|style="width: 130px"|CCF
|Clarence G. Willis
|align="right"|3,471
|align="right"|40.26%
|align="right"|-1.37

 
|Prog. Conservative
|Ken Aseltine
|align="right"|2,094
|align="right"|24.29%
|align="right"|+8.44
|- bgcolor="white"
!align="left" colspan=3|Total
!align="right"|8,621
!align="right"|100.00%
!align="right"|

|-
 
|style="width: 130px"|CCF
|Clarence G. Willis
|align="right"|3,318
|align="right"|41.63%
|align="right"|-4.12

 
|Prog. Conservative
|Ken Aseltine
|align="right"|1,264
|align="right"|15.85%
|align="right"|-

|- bgcolor="white"
!align="left" colspan=3|Total
!align="right"|7,971
!align="right"|100.00%
!align="right"|

|-
 
|style="width: 130px"|CCF
|Clarence G. Willis
|align="right"|3,738
|align="right"|45.75%
|align="right"|-5.60

|- bgcolor="white"
!align="left" colspan=3|Total
!align="right"|8,170
!align="right"|100.00%
!align="right"|

|-
 
|style="width: 130px"|CCF
|Clarence G. Willis
|align="right"|4,602
|align="right"|51.35%
|align="right"|–

 
|Prog. Conservative
|Fred G. Green
|align="right"|1,106
|align="right"|12.34%
|align="right"|–
|- bgcolor="white"
!align="left" colspan=3|Total
!align="right"|8,962
!align="right"|100.00%
!align="right"|

Melfort (1912–1952)

|-

 
|CCF
|Oakland W. Valleau
|align="right"|4,035
|align="right"|49.82%
|align="right"|-0.80
|- bgcolor="white"
!align="left" colspan=3|Total
!align="right"|8,100
!align="right"|100.00%
!align="right"|

|-
 
|style="width: 130px"|CCF
|Oakland W. Valleau
|align="right"|3,396
|align="right"|50.62%
|align="right"|+14.25

 
|Conservative
|Stanley B. Caskey
|align="right"|1,450
|align="right"|21.62%
|align="right"|+2.33
|- bgcolor="white"
!align="left" colspan=3|Total
!align="right"|6,708
!align="right"|100.00%
!align="right"|

|-
 
|style="width: 130px"|CCF
|Oakland W. Valleau
|align="right"|3,024
|align="right"|36.37%
|align="right"|–

 
|Conservative
|Gilbert D. Eamer
|align="right"|1,604
|align="right"|19.29%
|align="right"|-25.73

|- bgcolor="white"
!align="left" colspan=3|Total
!align="right"|8,314
!align="right"|100.00%
!align="right"|

|-

 
|Conservative
|Rupert Greaves
|align="right"|3,252
|align="right"|45.02%
|align="right"|-12.39
|- bgcolor="white"
!align="left" colspan=3|Total
!align="right"|7,224
!align="right"|100.00%
!align="right"|

|-
 
|style="width: 130px"|Conservative
|Rupert Greaves
|align="right"|3,411
|align="right"|57.41%
|align="right"|+34.43

|- bgcolor="white"
!align="left" colspan=3|Total
!align="right"|5,942
!align="right"|100.00%
!align="right"|

|-

 
|Conservative
|Gilbert M. Irvine
|align="right"|833
|align="right"|22.98%
|align="right"|-
|- bgcolor="white"
!align="left" colspan=3|Total
!align="right"|3,626
!align="right"|100.00%
!align="right"|

|-

  
|Independent
|John Alexander McDonald
|align="right"|1,143
|align="right"|38.24%
|align="right"|+0.45
|- bgcolor="white"
!align="left" colspan=3|Total
!align="right"|2,989
!align="right"|100.00%
!align="right"|

|-

 
|Conservative
|John Alexander McDonald
|align="right"|1,009
|align="right"|37.79%
|align="right"|-6.34
|- bgcolor="white"
!align="left" colspan=3|Total
!align="right"|2,670
!align="right"|100.00%
!align="right"|

|-

 
|Conservative
|Thomas Charles Spence
|align="right"|646
|align="right"|44.13%
|align="right"|–
|- bgcolor="white"
!align="left" colspan=3|Total
!align="right"|1,464
!align="right"|100.00%
!align="right"|

References

External links 
Website of the Legislative Assembly of Saskatchewan
Saskatchewan Archives Board – Saskatchewan Election Results By Electoral Division

Saskatchewan provincial electoral districts